David MacIntyre (born 1952) is a Canadian composer of opera, music theatre, choral, orchestral and chamber music, and site-specific works in dance and theatre, based in Vancouver. He is a professor of Music Composition at Simon Fraser University in Vancouver. His music has been performed in more than thirty countries.

Early life and education
MacIntyre was born in Yorkton, Saskatchewan; as a child, he studied brass instruments, theatre arts, voice and piano. In 1969, he attended the Banff School for Fine Arts. He attended the University of Saskatchewan (1970–72), where he studied composition with Murray Adaskin, voice with Dorothy Howard, and University of Victoria (73-75 B.Mus and 77-79 M.Mus), where he studied composition with Rudolf Komorous, conducting with George Corwin, voice with Selena James. In 1977, he wrote his first opera Humulus the Mute on a libretto by Jean Anouilh, translation by Michael Benedickt. Humulus the Mute was premiered in 1979 in a production conducted by George Corwin, directed by the composer and featuring Erika Kurth and Richard Margison.[9]

Career
In 1979, MacIntyre was invited to join the faculty at Simon Fraser University where he co-founded the Contemporary music program and where he taught courses in music composition and interdisciplinary collaboration in the School for the Contemporary Arts for thirty eight years until his retirement on September 1, 2017.

In 1983 MacIntyre collaborated with choreographer Karen Jamieson to develop Sisyphus, which was named one of the ten best choreographic works of the twentieth century by Danse Canada Dance magazine. In 1988, his music for Piazza for ten saxophones and twenty-four dancers created in collaboration with Montreal choreographer Jean Pierre Perreault received excellent notice from Anna Kisselgoff in the New York Times: "Certainly the score by David MacIntyre, a composer from Vancouver, British Columbia, worked to perfection in its fragmentary structure. Separate phrases (not always melodic) were often played by soloists but also by all 10 instrumentalists, creating rich overlapping textures.". His 1994 opera The Architect, in collaboration with playwright Tom Cone, was the first opera to be commissioned by the Vancouver Opera. That year he composed Ave Maria , which has become one of his most widely known and performed compositions.

In 2009 MacIntyre was commissioned to write a song, Hammer, for the 150th anniversary of British Columbia. His 2012 opera cabaret Love in Public , a staged, four-singer setting of Elizabeth Barrett Browning's poetry collection Sonnets from the Portuguese, was nominated for Outstanding Original Composition by Jesse Richardson Theatre Awards in 2012.

MacIntyre's musical drama Tom Pinkerton, The Ballad of Butterfly's Son (2008), created in collaboration with playwright Hiro Kanagawa, was shortlisted for Best Musical of 2012 by the Playwrights Guild of Canada.

Style
MacIntyre is predominantly known as a composer for the theatre; he has written operas, music theatre works, instrumental theatre works, art songs, and choral works. His music emphasizes rhythm, lyricism and smooth orchestration.

Personal
In 1990, MacIntyre met dancer Catherine Josephine Lubinsky and they married in 1992.

Selected works
 Humulus the Mute (1977)
 "Sisyphus" (1983)
 "Piazza" (1988, with Jean Pierre Perreault)
 "The Architect" (1994, with Tom Cone)
 "Ave Maria" (1994)
 "Love in Public" (2004)
 "Alleluia" (2011)
 Late Canadian Carols (2016)

References

5. "Grim Visions in a Garden" by Anna Kisselgoff, New York Times, July 1, 1988

External links
Canadian Music Centre, accessed 16 February 2010
Official website

1952 births
21st-century classical composers
20th-century classical composers
Canadian classical composers
Living people
Academic staff of Simon Fraser University
Musicians from Saskatchewan
People from Yorkton
Canadian male classical composers
20th-century Canadian composers
20th-century Canadian male musicians
21st-century Canadian male musicians